The Raft River is a tributary of the North Thompson River, one of the main tributaries of the Fraser River, in the Canadian province of British Columbia. It flows through the Shuswap Highland region southeast of Wells Gray Provincial Park. Most of the Raft River's watershed lies outside the boundaries of Wells Gray, except for some of the headwaters of the West Raft River tributary.

Course
The Raft River originates in the Columbia Mountains between Wells Gray Provincial Park and the North Thompson River, south of the Blue River and southwest of the town of Blue River. It flows generally south through the Shuswap Highland to join the North Thompson River just east of Clearwater.

As the Raft River flows south it is joined by tributaries such as Richie Creek, Stratton Creek, Maxwell Creek, West Raft River, Blowhole Creek, Moilliet Creek, McCorvie Creek, and Willis Creek.

See also
 List of tributaries of the Fraser River

References

Thompson Country
Tributaries of the Fraser River
Rivers of British Columbia
Kamloops Division Yale Land District